Long Gully is a suburb of the regional city of Bendigo in Victoria, Australia,  north-west of the Bendigo central business district. At the 2016 census, Long Gully had a population of 3,383.

Long Gully is a working-class suburb of Bendigo, with many older style fibro houses, punctuated by well-established light industry. The suburb is the location of the Bendigo RSL club, in Havilah Road.

Long Gully was heavily affected by the Black Saturday bushfires, causing one death.

It is the birthplace of Dick Richards, GC (14 November 1894 – 8 May 1986). Richards was an Australian science teacher who joined Sir Ernest Shackleton's Imperial Trans-Antarctic Expedition in December 1914 as a physicist with the Ross Sea Party. He was 22 years old. He outlived all other members of the expedition and became the last survivor of the so-called "Heroic Age" of Antarctic exploration, dying at the age of 91 in 1986. His life-saving feats in the Antarctic are detailed in the book Shackleton's Heroes.

References

Suburbs of Bendigo
Bendigo